Angéla Smuczer (born 11 February 1982, in Eger) is a Hungarian football midfielder who plays for MTK Hungária in Hungary's Női NB I. She has also played in France's Division 1 Féminine for US Compiègne.

She is a member of the Hungarian national team.

Titles
 Hungarian Women's League: 2003, 2007, 2008, 2010, 2011, 2012, 2013
 Hungarian Women's Cup: 2004, 2010, 2013

References

1982 births
Living people
Hungarian women's footballers
Renova players
1. FC Femina players
László Kórház SC players
MTK Hungária FC (women) players
Expatriate women's footballers in France
Hungarian expatriates in France
Sportspeople from Eger
Women's association football midfielders
FIFA Century Club
Hungary women's international footballers